Francois Badenhorst, better known by his stage name Francois Van Coke, rose to fame as the front man of South African rock bands Fokofpolisiekar and Van Coke Kartel. On the 8 April 2015, Francois launched his self-titled debut solo album and kicked his solo career into gear with the release of – Toe Vind Ek Jou featuring Karen Zoid. It was the first Afrikaans album and single to simultaneously jump to number one positions on the South African iTunes Store. The song was downloaded more than 20,000 times on iTunes, achieving Platinum status as a single. The music video for "Toe Vind Ek Jou" was viewed over a million times within six-month and was announced as the biggest Afrikaans music video of 2015. His second album, Hierdie is die Lewe followed in 2017 and in 2018 he released a collab-EP, Francois van Coke en Vriende featuring collaborations with Die Heuwels Fantasties, Early B, Laudo Liebenberg and Jack Parow. The first season of his TV show, Die Van Coke Show, aired in 2018. His third solo album, Dagdrome in Suburbia, released in October 2019. He has a daughter named Alex, age , and an infant boy.

Van Coke has always had an affinity for music. Moving to Boston, Bellville, Western Cape in early childhood where he grew up, he participated in high school in a battle of the bands competition where he performed the vocals for the band. He was later kicked out of the band, which put him off performing vocals for a while. Van Coke's strong Christian upbringing (his father was a pastor) led him to create the Christian band AS180. Van Coke established himself in the Bellville underground music scene by forming the band "A Guy Called Gerald", which later changed its name to "New World Inside". Van Coke then co-founded the rock band Fokofpolisiekar. The band was initially started as a joke to shock the widely conservative Afrikaans community. Van Coke recalls that, "My mom cried for a day or two when she heard the name of the band". After initial performances his father asked him to change his surname from "Badenhorst" to "Van Coke", as his father, being a minister, was receiving complaints about his son's performances from the local church-going community.

Awards

Best of 2017 accolades
 Jacaranda FM – the biggest songs of 2017
 Texx and the City – Top 10 music videos
 2Oceansvibe Radio – Best of 2017 – Top 20 songs
 Western Cape Bokkies 2017: Award for Male singer of the year.

Francois Van Coke – self-titled debut album (2015)
 Ghoema Awards for: Most Popular Song of the Year – "Toe vind ek jou”"
 Rock Album of the Year, Best Song of the Year – "Toe vind ek jou"
 Digital Album of the Year, Digital song of the year – "Toe vind ek jou"
 The CD was on the Top 20 Best Sellers list in South Africa for at least 12 weeks and also on the Top 30 for 2015.
 OFM Golden Note – Local Song of the Year: "Toe vind ek jou"
 Silver Pendoring - Craft: "Toe vind ek jou" musiekvideo

References

External links
 
 

21st-century South African male singers
Living people
South African guitarists
Male guitarists
1980 births
21st-century guitarists
White South African people